Myint Tayzar Phone born July 2, 1978) is a sprint canoer from Myanmar who competed in the late 2000s. At the 2008 Summer Olympics in Beijing, he was eliminated in the semifinals of the K-1 500 m event and the heats of the K-1 1000 m event.

References
Sports-Reference.com profile

External links
 

1978 births
Burmese male canoeists
Canoeists at the 2008 Summer Olympics
Living people
Olympic canoeists of Myanmar
Southeast Asian Games bronze medalists for Myanmar
Southeast Asian Games medalists in rowing
Competitors at the 2001 Southeast Asian Games